Natalie Whitford Uhl (1919–2017) was an American botanist who specialised in palms.

The eldest of three sisters, she grew up on a farm in Rhode Island. She graduated B.S in 1940 from Rhode Island State College, publishing two papers on general plant morphology with Vernon Cheadle, her senior year advisor, the same year. In 1940 she went to Cornell University, earning her M.S. in 1943, and her Ph.D. in 1947. While at Cornell, she met and married her husband, Charles Uhl, abandoning botany to start a family.

Her work with palms began in 1963, when she returned to Cornell to work with Harold E. Moore, who was also the chief editor of Principes, the journal which later became Palms. She published her first article as sole author in 1966, on palm inflorescence morphology. 
In 1978, she and John Dransfield became associate editors of Principes, and co-editors in 1980 with the death of Moore. She continued to co-edit it until 2000.

In 2002, she won the Asa Gray award, awarded by the American Society of Plant Taxonomists "for outstanding accomplishments pertinent to the goals of the society".  The Eocene fossil palm Uhlia allanbyensis was named in recognition of her work on palm taxonomy in 1994.

Published names 
As a taxonomist, Uhl described twelve new species, all of them in conjunction with other palm taxonomists. She first described two species in conjunction with Dransfield in 1984; the two described another species two years later. She published nine new species in 1990, in conjunction with Donald Robert Hodel -these are all southern Central American dwarf palms in the genus Chamaedorea. Along with Dransfield, and in one case Anthony Kyle Irvine, she also published a handful of recombinations, notably moving the monotypic African Wissmannia carinensis to the East Asian and Australian Livistona. After the publication of their 1983 book Genera Palmarum, she and Dransfield formally described a number of the new infrageneric taxa proposed in it in a 1986 article. She is also credited as part of a large team which sequenced genetic code across the Arecaceae, and in 2005 created a few higher taxa to reclassify the infrageneric taxonomy.
 Halmoorea trispatha J.Dransf. & N.W.Uhl (1984)
 Marojejya darianii J.Dransf. & N.W.Uhl (1984)
 Ravenea moorei J.Dransf. & N.W.Uhl (1986)
 Chamaedorea correae Hodel & N.W.Uhl (1990)
 Chamaedorea guntheriana Hodel & N.W.Uhl (1990)
 Chamaedorea palmeriana Hodel & N.W.Uhl (1990)
 Chamaedorea pedunculata Hodel & N.W.Uhl (1990)
 Chamaedorea robertii Hodel & N.W.Uhl (1990)
 Chamaedorea sullivaniorum Hodel & N.W.Uhl (1990)
 Chamaedorea undulatifolia Hodel & N.W.Uhl (1990)
 Chamaedorea vistae Hodel & N.W.Uhl (1990)
 Chamaedorea whitelockiana Hodel & N.W.Uhl (1990)

Selected works 

 Moore, H.E.Jr. & Uhl, N.W. (1984). The indigenous palms of New Caledonia. Lawai, Kauai, Hawaii, Pacific Tropical Botanical Garden.
 Dransfield, J., Uhl, N.W., et al. (2008). Genera Palmarum: evolution and classification of palms. Second edition. Kew Publishing.

References 

American botanists
Cornell University alumni
Cornell University faculty
1919 births
2017 deaths
American women botanists
University of Rhode Island alumni
American women academics
21st-century American women